Roman Polom (born 17 December 1966) is a Czech weightlifter. He competed in the men's heavyweight I event at the 1996 Summer Olympics.

References

External links
 

1966 births
Living people
Czech male weightlifters
Olympic weightlifters of the Czech Republic
Weightlifters at the 1996 Summer Olympics
People from Sokolov
Sportspeople from the Karlovy Vary Region